Therazhundur Vedapureeswarar Temple is a Hindu temple located at Therazhundur in Mayiladuthurai district of Tamil Nadu, India. The historical name of the place is Thirunedungalam. The presiding deity is Shiva. He is called as Vedapureeswarar. His consort is known as Soundaraambigai. At the right side of the temple, Madesvarar shrine is found.

Significance 

It is one of the shrines of the 275 Paadal Petra Sthalams - Shiva Sthalams glorified in the early medieval Tevaram poems by Tamil Saivite Nayanar Tirugnanasambandar. The temple is counted as one of the temples built on the banks of River Kaveri.

Literary Mention 
Tirugnanasambandar describes the feature of the deity as:

Gallery

References

External links 
 
 

Shiva temples in Mayiladuthurai district
Padal Petra Stalam